Alpha-sarcoglycan is a protein that in humans is encoded by the SGCA gene.

Function
The dystrophin-glycoprotein complex (DGC) comprises a group of proteins that are critical to the stability of muscle fiber membranes and to the linking of the actin cytoskeleton to the extracellular matrix. Components of the DGC include dystrophin (MIM 300377), which is deficient in Duchenne muscular dystrophy (DMD; MIM 310200); syntrophins (e.g., MIM 600026); dystroglycans (MIM 128239); and sarcoglycans, such as adhalin, a 50-kD transmembrane protein (Roberds et al., 1993).[supplied by OMIM]

Interactions
SGCA has been shown to interact with Biglycan.

References

Further reading

External links
LOVD mutation database: SGCA